The 1978 NAIA World Series was the 22nd annual tournament hosted by the National Association of Intercollegiate Athletics to determine the national champion of baseball among its member colleges and universities in the United States and Canada.

After thirteen seasons (1962–1969, 1974–1978), this was the last tournament staged at Phil Welch Stadium in St. Joseph, Missouri.

Emporia State (40-20-2), emerging from the consolation bracket, defeated Missouri Southern State (24–16) in a single-game championship series, 8–6, to win the Hornets' first NAIA World Series.

Emporia State pitcher Kevin Mendon was named tournament MVP.

Bracket

See also
 1978 NCAA Division I baseball tournament
 1978 NCAA Division II baseball tournament
 1978 NCAA Division III baseball tournament

Reference

|NAIA World Series
NAIA World Series
NAIA World Series
NAIA World Series